Stepwise may refer to:
Stepwise reaction
Stepwise refinement
Stepwise regression

See also
Step function, a mathematical function
Steps and skips, a musical term